Christian August II, Duke  of Schleswig-Holstein-Sonderburg-Augustenburg (19 July 1798 – 11 March 1869, Christian Carl Frederik August), commonly known as Christian, Duke of Augustenborg, was a Danish/German prince and statesman. During the 1850s and 1860s, he was a claimant to first duke of the whole provinces of Schleswig and Holstein, and a candidate to become king of Denmark following the death of King Frederick VII. He was the father-in-law of Princess Helena (daughter of Queen Victoria) and the paternal grandfather of Augusta Victoria, Empress of Germany and wife of Kaiser Wilhelm II.

Family and lineage

He was closely related to Kings Christian VII, Frederick VI and Christian VIII of Denmark through his mother and was a claimant for the Danish throne in the 1860s.

Born a prince of the House of Schleswig-Holstein-Sonderburg-Augustenburg and scion of a cadet-line descendant of the Danish royal House of Oldenburg, Christian August was the fiefholder of Augustenborg and Sønderborg. He was also a claimant to the rulership of the provinces of Slesvig and Holstein, and he was also a candidate to become king of Denmark during the succession crisis caused by the childlessness of King Frederick VII of Denmark. He lost the chance to ascend the throne to his distant kinsman, Prince Christian of Schleswig-Holstein-Sonderburg-Beck.

Christian August was the eldest son and heir of Frederik Christian II, Duke of Augustenborg and his wife Princess Louise Auguste of Denmark. His father was the head of the senior cadet branch of the ruling house of Denmark, and thus the nearest agnatic kin of the kings of Denmark. Furthermore, his mother Louisa Auguste was (officially) the daughter of King Christian VII of Denmark, the sister of King Frederick VI and the first cousin of King Christian VIII. Due to all this, Christian August was high in the line of succession to the Danish throne. He also enjoyed additional influence in the Danish court because his sister, Caroline Amalie, was the beloved second wife of King Christian VIII (his mother's cousin).

Christian August's family lost out in the competition for the throne of Denmark mainly because of the widely accepted belief that his mother was actually fathered by Johann Friedrich Struensee, Christian VII's royal physician. If true, this would mean Christian August was not a true legitimate descendant of Frederick III, the first hereditary monarch of Denmark. His claim was further weakened by having married for love to Countess Louise Sophie Danneskiold-Samsøe, a woman of unequal rank.

Biography
In 1848, German-nationalist sympathies prompted a rebellion in Schleswig-Holstein against Danish rule. A provisional government was established at Kiel under the Duke of Augustenborg, who travelled to Berlin to secure the assistance of Prussia in asserting his rights. The First War of Schleswig ensued.

However, European powers were united in opposing any dismemberment of Denmark. Among others, Emperor Nicholas I of Russia, speaking with authority as Head of the elder Holstein-Gottorp line, regarded the Duke of Augustenborg a rebel. Russia had guaranteed Schleswig to the Danish crown by the treaties of 1767 and 1773.

A treaty of peace between Prussia and Denmark was signed at Berlin on 2 July 1850. Both parties reserved their antecedent rights. Denmark was satisfied that the treaty empowered the king-duke to restore his authority in Holstein with or without the consent of the German Confederation. Augustenburg was ousted from power, as Danish troops marched in to subdue the duchies.

The question of the Augustenburg succession made an agreement between the major powers impossible, and on 31 March 1852 the duke of Augustenburg resigned his claim in return for a money payment. Duke Christian sold his rights to the Duchy of Schleswig-Holstein to Denmark in the aftermath of the Treaty of London, but later renounced his rights to the Duchy of Schleswig-Holstein in favor of his son Frederik August.

In November 1863, his son Frederick proclaimed himself rightful second Duke of Schleswig and Holstein.

Duke Christian August died in 1869.

Marriage and issue

Christian married in 1820 his second cousin, Countess Lovisa-Sophie af Danneskjold-Samsøe (1797–1867), a Danish noblewoman who belonged to the House of Danneskiold-Samsøe, which in turn was an illegitimate branch of the Danish royal House of Oldenburg. They had seven children:
Prince Alexander Frederick William Christian Charles Augustus (20 July 1821 – 3 May 1823), died young
Princess Louise Auguste (28 August 1823 – 30 May 1872)
Princess Caroline Amelie (15 January 1826 – 3 May 1901)
Princess Wilhelmine (24 March 1828 – 4 July 1829), died young
Prince Frederick Christian August (6 July 1829 – 14 January 1880), later Duke of Schleswig-Holstein-Sonderburg-Augustenburg. He married Princess Adelheid of Hohenlohe-Langenburg and had issue one surviving son and four daughters including Augusta Viktoria "Dona", Empress of Germany as wife of Kaiser Wilhelm II.
Frederick Christian Charles Augustus (22 January 1831 – 28 October 1917), later (1866) married his third cousin Princess Helena of the United Kingdom (daughter of Queen Victoria) and settled in England. They were the parents of Albert, Duke of Schleswig-Holstein.
Princess Caroline Christiane Auguste Emilie Henriette Elisabeth (2 August 1833-1917)

Place in Danish royal family and claim to throne

Ancestry

References

Bibliography 

 Johannes Heinrich Gebauer: Christian August, Herzog von Schleswig Holstein. Ein Beitrag zur Geschichte der Befreiung Schleswig-Holsteins. Deutsche Verlags-Anstalt, Stuttgart u. a. 1910.
 Karl Lorentzen: Christian Karl Friedrich August, Herzog von Schleswig-Holstein. In: Allgemeine Deutsche Biographie (ADB). Band 4, Duncker & Humblot, Leipzig 1876, S. 205–211.
 Hans Harald Hennings: Christian Karl Friedrich August. In: Neue Deutsche Biographie (NDB). Band 3, Duncker & Humblot, Berlin 1957, S. 237 f.
 Mikkel Venborg Pedersen: Die Herzöge von Augustenburg; in: Die Fürsten des Landes. Herzöge und Grafen von Schleswig, Holstein und Lauenburg, im Auftrag der Gesellschaft für Schleswig-Holsteinische Geschichte herausgegeben, S. 310–341.

External links 

Dukes of Schleswig-Holstein-Sonderburg-Augustenburg
House of Augustenburg
1798 births
1869 deaths
Princes of Schleswig-Holstein-Sonderburg-Augustenburg
Nobility from Copenhagen
People of the First Schleswig War
Member of the Prussian National Assembly